Ghosts of Abu Ghraib is a 2007 documentary film, directed by Rory Kennedy, that examines the events of the 2004 Abu Ghraib torture and prisoner abuse scandal. The film premiered January 19, 2007, at the 2007 Sundance Film Festival.

The film aired on HBO on February 22, 2007. It was also shown at the Human Rights Watch Film Festival on March 23, 2007, and at the Cleveland International Film Festival on March 25, 2007.

Working Films coordinated the US national community engagement campaign with Ghosts of Abu Ghraib. It brought together the National Religious Campaign Against Torture, the American Civil Liberties Union, faith groups, and others to end US policy sanctioning torture.

Critical reception
The film was nominated for 4 Emmys at the 59th Primetime Emmy Awards in the categories of Outstanding Non-Fiction Special, Outstanding Directing for Non-Fiction Programming, Outstanding Picture Editing for Non-Fiction Programming, and Outstanding Sound Editing for Non-Fiction Programming. It won the award for Outstanding Non-Fiction Special.

References

External links

Ghosts of Abu Ghraib at Working Films
Ghosts of Abu Ghraib at the Iraq Media Action Project
Profile, from the 2007 Sundance Film Festival
Ghosts of Abu Ghraib at HBO

Ghosts of Abu Ghraib  at Metacritic

Mother Jones review of Ghosts of Abu Ghraib

2007 films
American documentary films
Abu Ghraib torture and prisoner abuse
Documentary films about the Iraq War
2007 documentary films
Documentary films about torture
2000s English-language films
2000s American films